"The Ballad of Chasey Lain" is a song by American alternative rock band Bloodhound Gang. It was released in February 2000 as the third single from their third studio album, Hooray for Boobies (2000). The song reached number one in Iceland and became a top-20 hit in Austria, Finland, Germany, Spain, and the United Kingdom.

Content
According to a band interview to the BBC, the song was written after Jimmy Pop had seen pornographic film actress Chasey Lain in a clothing ad. When questioned if the infatuation was real, he commented "No. No. What happened was, I saw her in a clothing ad, and I was like, 'she's really cute'.  So I'm not sure if we started 'researching' Chasey Lain but she came out and performed on our record with us, and her arms were like, hairier than mine. And she was dumber than that table".

Music video
The music video features the band performing the song on stage, and the director and the film crew are all naked women. Throughout the course of the video, the band is apparently becoming distracted by the naked women, and Jared Hasselhoff even walks and falls off the stage while distracted. At the end of the video, Jimmy Pop complains about being distracted and an obese man eating food in a sloppy and disgusting manner is shown, implying that Pop was distracted by him, rather than the naked women.

Charts

Weekly charts

Year-end charts

Release history

References

External links
 

Bloodhound Gang songs
1999 songs
2000 singles
Cultural depictions of American women
Cultural depictions of pornographic film actors
Geffen Records singles
Number-one singles in Iceland
Songs about actors
Songs written by Jimmy Pop